is a large power station in Ichihara, Chiba, Japan. The facility operates with an installed capacity of 3,600 MW. Power is generated by six turbines rated at 600 MW. The station utilizes six 600 MW units, which use the following types of fuel.
 Unit 1: Natural gas, fuel oil, crude oil
 Unit 2: Natural gas, fuel oil, crude oil
 Unit 3: Natural gas, fuel oil, crude oil, LPG
 Unit 4: Natural gas, fuel oil, crude oil, LPG
 Unit 5: Natural gas, LPG
 Unit 6: Natural gas, LPG

See also 

 List of largest power stations in the world
 List of power stations in Japan

References 

Oil-fired power stations in Japan
Natural gas-fired power stations in Japan
Tokyo Electric Power Company
Buildings and structures in Chiba Prefecture
Ichihara, Chiba